Susan Lynn "Suze" Orman (born June 5, 1951) is an American financial advisor, author, and podcast host. In 1987, she founded the Suze Orman Financial Group. Her work as a financial advisor gained notability with The Suze Orman Show, which ran on CNBC from 2002 to 2015.

Orman has written ten consecutive  New York Times bestsellers about personal finance. She was named twice to the Time 100 list of influential people, has won two Emmy Awards, and eight Gracie Awards. Orman has written, co-produced and hosted 9 PBS specials, and has appeared on multiple additional television shows. She has been a guest on The Oprah Winfrey Show approximately 29 times and Larry King Live over 30 times. Orman is currently the podcast host of the "Suze Orman Women & Money Podcast."

Early life and education
Orman was born on the South Side of Chicago on June 5, 1951, to Jewish parents of Russian and Romanian origin, Ann and Morry Orman. Her mother worked as a secretary for a local rabbi, while her father, an immigrant from Kyiv, worked in a chicken factory and managed Morry's Deli in Hyde Park.

She attended the University of Illinois at Urbana-Champaign, where she earned a B.A. in social work in 1976. In 2009, Orman received an honorary doctorate of humane letters from the University of Illinois at Urbana–Champaign. The following year, in 2010, she was presented with an honorary doctorate of Commercial Science from Bentley University.

Career

After finishing school, Orman moved to Berkeley, California, where she worked as a waitress. In 1980, she borrowed $52,000 from friends to open a restaurant.

According to Orman, as an investment novice, she invested that money through a representative at Merrill Lynch, who promptly lost her entire investment in trading options. Later, Orman trained as an account executive for Merrill Lynch, where she reports that she learned that the type of investment her broker had put her in was not suitable for her needs, as option trading is considered a high-risk but high-reward investment suitable only for high net worth individuals. Orman further asserts that it was explained to her that because her broker was the highest producing representative in the office, his actions went unchecked. After completing her training with Merrill Lynch, she remained at the firm until 1983, when she left to become a vice president of investments at Prudential Bache Securities.

In 1987, Orman resigned from Prudential and founded the Suze Orman Financial Group, in Emeryville, California. While there, she published a booklet, The Facts on Single Premium Whole Life, which compared single-premium whole life, universal life, and single-premium deferred annuities; she distributed copies of the booklet for free to anyone who requested one. She was director of the firm until 1997.

Orman published ten original books between 1995 and 2020: You've Earned It Don't Lose It (1995), The 9 Steps to Financial Freedom (1997), The Courage to be Rich (1999), The Road to Wealth (2001), The Laws of Money, The Lessons of Life (2003), The Money Book for the Young Fabulous and Broke (2005), Women & Money (2007), The 2009 Action Plan (2009), The Money Class (2011), The Adventures of Billy & Penny (2017, children's book). Orman also published three updated versions of her bestselling books: Suze Orman's Action Plan: New Rules for New Times (March 2010), The Money Class: How to Stand in Your Truth and Create the Future You Deserve (2012), Women & Money: Be Smart Strong and Secure (Sept 2018), The Ultimate Retirement Guide for 50+ (2020).

The Suze Orman Show began airing on CNBC in 2002. In February 2008, Orman gave away copies of her book Women and Money for free following an appearance on The Oprah Winfrey Show, generating almost two million downloads. 2008–2010, she was portrayed on Saturday Night Live by Kristen Wiig. Orman has been featured on the Food Network's Paula's Party. In January 2011, Orman appeared on Oprah's Allstars. In January 2012, Orman's six-episode TV series America's Money Class with Suze Orman premiered on OWN: Oprah Winfrey Network. For this show, Orman answered questions about money management. Money Class lasted six episodes.

Orman wrote a financial advice column for O, The Oprah Magazine. She is the former author of  Yahoo!'s "Money Matters" and writes for the Costco Connection Magazine. She contributed to The Philadelphia Inquirer, Lowes MoneyWorks, and Your Business at Home Magazine.

Orman's final episode of The Suze Orman Show aired on March 28, 2015, reportedly so that Orman could develop a new series, Suze Orman's Money Wars, for Warner Bros. Telepictures Productions. Orman hoped the show would premiere in 2016 but it was not produced.

In 2016, Orman was appointed as a personal finance educator for the United States Army and Army Reserve.

In 2018, Suze began serving as a Special Advocate for the National Domestic Violence Hotline, to help spread awareness regarding financial abuse.

Suze is currently the podcast host of the twice-weekly Suze Orman Women & Money Podcast.

In 2020 Suze co founded Securesave a company whose sole purpose is to change the savings rate in America by providing employer match emergency savings plans for employees

Personal life
In February 2007, Orman stated that she is a lesbian. Orman has been married to Kathy Travis (nicknamed KT) since 2010. Travis is also her business partner.  According to Orman, "KT’s career has been building brands, and I’m a brand."

In 2008, Orman donated money to the Democratic Party. In a 2008 interview with Larry King, she said she favors the policies of the Democratic Party and Barack Obama, especially regarding people in same-sex relationships.

Controversies
In 2012, Orman introduced the Approved prepaid debit card, which was backed by Bancorp Bank. The card generated a great deal of controversy for its hidden fees and false promise of contributing to a FICO score. Cardholders were charged a $3 monthly fee, as well as fees for check writing and customer service calls. The Approved card's features included credit reports and credit scores from TransUnion, as well as credit monitoring and identity theft protection. TransUnion also agreed to "examine data from Approved cards", which was unusual for prepaid debit cards, but did not factor the card's usage into the cardholders' FICO scores. In July 2014, the Approved card was discontinued.

Orman has also received criticism for making misleading statements relating to her credentials and achievements, notably her time teaching at the controversial for-profit University of Phoenix.

Bibliography

Books
You've Earned It, Don't Lose It: Mistakes You Can't Afford to Make When You Retire (with Linda Mead) (1995)
The Nine Steps To Financial Freedom: Practical and Spiritual Steps So You Can Stop Worrying (1997)
The Courage to Be Rich: Creating a Life of Material and Spiritual Abundance (1999)
The Road to Wealth: Everything You Need to Know in Good and Bad Times (2001)
The Laws of Money, the Lessons of Life (2003)
The Money Book for the Young, Fabulous and Broke (2005)
Women and Money: Owning the Power to Control Your Destiny (2007)
Revised and updated: Women & Money: Be Smart Strong and Secure (Sept 2018)
Suze Orman's 2009 Action Plan: Keeping Your Money Safe and Sound (2009)
Revised and updated: Suze Orman's Action Plan: New Rules for New Times (March 2010)
The Money Class: Learn to Create Your New American Dream (March 2011)
Revised and updated: The Money Class: How to Stand in Your Truth and Create the Future You Deserve (2012)
 The Adventures of Billy & Penny (Jan 2017) (Children's Book Illustrated by wife, KT)
 The Ultimate Retirement Guide for 50+: Winning Strategies to Make your Money  Last  a Lifetime (Feb 2020)

Multimedia
Orman is also creator of a number of non-book products, primarily CD-ROM-based services that offer education and various financial services usually in conjunction with her books and writings.
Suze Ormans FICO Kit – First offered in 2002 in conjunction with Fair Isaac Corporation.
Suze Orman's Will & Trust Kit – Introduced in 2005 with her personal trust attorney.
Suze Orman's Insurance Kit – Introduced in 2007.
Suze Orman's Protection Portfolio – First introduced in 2002, in third version.
Suze Orman's Identity Theft Kit – First offered in 2008, in conjunction with TrustedID.
Suze Orman's Save Yourself Retirement Program – Introduced September 2009, in conjunction with TD Ameritrade.

References

External links

 

 
 
 
 Interview with Suze Orman by Eileen Cavanagh, A DISCUSSION WITH National Authors on Tour TV Series, Episode #151 (1995)

1951 births
Living people
20th-century American businesspeople
20th-century American businesswomen
20th-century American non-fiction writers
20th-century American women writers
21st-century American businesswomen
21st-century American businesspeople
21st-century American Jews
American consulting businesspeople
American finance and investment writers
American financial commentators
American investment advisors
American lesbian writers	
American people of Romanian-Jewish descent
American people of Russian-Jewish descent
American women restaurateurs
American self-help writers
American television hosts
American television writers
American women non-fiction writers
American women television presenters
American women television writers
Businesspeople from Chicago
CNBC people
Daytime Emmy Award winners
Illinois Democrats
Jewish American writers
Jewish women writers
American LGBT broadcasters	
American LGBT businesspeople	
LGBT Jews	
LGBT people from Illinois
Merrill (company) people
Personal finance education
Screenwriters from Illinois
Shorty Award winners
University of Illinois School of Social Work alumni
Writers from Chicago
Women business and financial journalists